Vandevi Dham, is the Temple of Vandevi and is located  at a distance of about 6 km from Renukut, about 76 km from Robertsganj  on Renukut-Shaktinagar Road, 1 km ahead of Rihand Dam  in Sonbhadra district, Uttar Pradesh. The Vandevi temple is dedicated to Vandevi, the Goddess of forest.

History and importance
The Idol installed in Vandevi Temple was excavated during the construction of Rihand Dam. Coconut and Chunari (headgear cloth) are offered to the main deity of the temple.

How to reach

Road
Accessed from Robertsganj via Renukut-Shaktinagar through SH-5 & NH-75

Train
Renukut is well connected by rail to all the major cities.

Air
Babatpur Airport, Varanasi about 186 km.

References 

Tourist attractions in Sonbhadra district
Hindu temples in Uttar Pradesh
Buildings and structures in Sonbhadra district
Renukoot